Johan Camilo Campaña Barrera (born 9 September 2002) is a Colombian footballer who currently plays as a forward for Deportivo Pasto.

Career statistics

Club

Notes

References

2002 births
Living people
Colombian footballers
Colombian expatriate footballers
Colombia youth international footballers
Association football forwards
People from Pasto, Colombia
Categoría Primera A players
Deportivo Pasto footballers
Argentinos Juniors footballers
Colombian expatriate sportspeople in Argentina
Expatriate footballers in Argentina
Sportspeople from Nariño Department